Onchestus is a genus of stick insects in the tribe Phasmatini.

Genera
 Onchestus gorgus (Westwood, 1859)
 Onchestus rentzi Brock & Hasenpusch, 2006

References

External links

Phasmatodea genera